Sheyang County is under the administration of Yancheng, Jiangsu province, China. It is located northeast of the Yancheng urban area, and has a population of 1,047,000.

Administrative divisions
In the present, Sheyang County has 13 towns.  
13 towns

Climate

References

www.xzqh.org 
 Jiqiang

External links 

County-level divisions of Jiangsu
Yancheng